Emilio Lozoya may refer to:

 Emilio Lozoya Thalmann (born 1948), former Mexican secretary of energy
 Emilio Lozoya Austin (born 1974), former CEO of PEMEX